Lycoperdininae is a beetle sub-family in the family Endomychidae.

External links 

Beetle subfamilies
Endomychidae